This is a list of rural localities in North Ossetia-Alania. The Republic of North Ossetia-Alania (Respublikæ Cægat Iryston-Alani) is a federal subject of Russia (a republic). Its population according to the 2010 Census was 712,980. Its capital is the city of Vladikavkaz.

Locations 
 Abaytikau
 Chikola
 Dargavs
 Elkhotovo
 Mizur
 Oktyabrskoye
 Verkhny Fiagdon

See also 
 
 Lists of rural localities in Russia

References 

North Ossetia-Alania